Paralamyctes hornerae is a species of centipede in the Henicopidae family. It was first described in 2001 by palaeontologist Gregory Edgecombe.

Distribution
The species occurs in north-eastern New South Wales. The type locality is the Styx River State Forest, in the Northern Tablelands district.

Behaviour
The centipedes are solitary terrestrial predators that inhabit plant litter and soil.

References

 

 
hornerae
Centipedes of Australia
Fauna of New South Wales
Animals described in 2001
Taxa named by Gregory Edgecombe